Above the Lake (translit. Nad ozerom) is a black-and-white 1995 cinema of the Russia independent film directed by Dmitrii Frolov. It is based on Alexander Blok novel Nad ozerom. 
The film is not an adaptation in the usual way: it is the reconstruction of the cinema of the beginning of the 20th century, performed by our contemporaries. Being a poetically philosophical reflection of the perception of A. Blok's poetry, the film at the same time reproduces the atmosphere of the legendary Silver Age.

Plot
A poor poet (perhaps Blok himself), his ghost-lady and the third character, subtly hinting with beauty and an article on Dantes, are immersed in authors not in a feast of aestheticism, but in the simple and eternal reality of our sinful world. Exhausted by passions, they are pathetic, they are beautiful in their own way, but how impudent are their impulses, completely fitting into the scheme of the classical love triangle. And only the imagination of the Poet, even spurred by cocaine, can transform this wretchedness into a hymn to the eternal confrontation of two men who have fallen in love with one woman.

Cast
Peter Kremis as Poor poet
Romil Rachev as The poet's friend
Natalya Surkova as Lady

Details
 Work on the film began in 1994, according to a script that does not at all resemble the final film.
 Filming took place in the very place where Alexander Blok wrote a poem "Above the Lake", as well as the famous "Stranger". This is the station "Shuvalovo-Ozerki", where at the beginning of the 20th century artistic youth and nobility loved to rest in the summer seasons. Some of the plans of the film are shot in place, from which the surrounding in Blok's poem is described with an accuracy of several meters (see "Above the Lake").
 Music for the film "Above the Lake" was composed and recorded in 2006 by the modern classical composer Sergei Alexandrovich Oskolkov.
 The original version of the 1995 film was 15 minutes, but then the whole scene was cut from it by the director, which reduced the film by a third.
 The film was shot on a camera with a manual drive, reminiscent of the technique of shooting films in the era of silent movies.

Festivals
 Light & Future International Film Festival, Houston, USA, March 2019 (Award)
 Once a Week Online Film Festival, USA, September, 2019
 Direct Monthly Online Film Festival, USA, October, 2019
 Festival Internacional de Cine Silente, Puebla, Mexico, November, 2019 (WINNER)
 Madras Independent Film Festival, Madras, India, July, 2020 (Award Winner)
 Global Monthly Online Film Competition, Canada, July, 2020 (Award Winner)

References

External links

Official site of the film
In the club "Sinefantom"
About the film on the site "CINEFANTOM"
About the film on the site "Another movie"
Sobaka.Ru St. Petersburg in the thrash cinema
Experimental cinema
Nevidannoye kino
Dmitry Frolov and the editing film 
NAD OZEROM
Kinorium
SMAE

1995 films
1990s Russian-language films
Russian black-and-white films
Films based on works by Alexander Blok
Films based on Russian novels
Films about size change
Films directed by Dmitrii Frolov
Russian short films
Russian independent films
Russian avant-garde and experimental films
Russian silent short films
1995 short films
1995 independent films
1990s avant-garde and experimental films